Trioctylphosphine selenide (TOPSe) is an organophosphorus compound with the formula SeP(C8H17)3. It is used as a source of selenium in the preparation of cadmium selenide.  TOPSe is a white, air-stable solid that is soluble in organic solvents.  The molecule features a tetrahedral phosphorus center.

Preparation and use
TOPSe is usually prepared by oxidation of trioctylphosphine with elemental selenium:

Often the reaction is conducted without isolation of the TOPSe.

As a solution with trioctylphosphine oxide, TOPSe reacts with dimethylcadmium to give cadmium selenide.  The mechanism is proposed to proceed in two steps, beginning with the formation of cadmium metal followed by its oxidation with the TOPSe.  Similarly it has been used to produce lead selenide.

References

Organophosphorus compounds
Selenides